Savannah Masonic Center is a historic building at 341 Bull Street in downtown Savannah, Georgia, United States. Standing in the southwestern corner of Madison Square, it was constructed between 1913 and 1923, to a design by Hyman Witcover, previously the architect of Savannah City Hall. Today it is known as Gryphon, and is part of the Savannah College of Art and Design (SCAD).

The land on which the building stands was purchased in November 1895. Eight years later, a general appeal was made to the masonic community for additional support in financing the construction of a masonic hall. The corner stone was laid on June 30, 1913, by Robert L. Colding, Grand Master of Masons in Georgia. The building's construction was completed a decade later and deeded to the Scottish Rite.

SCAD purchased the property in 1981.

In June 2019, the Masonic quarters were sold, and the Scottish Rite Masonic Center was moved to a new home on Chatham Center Drive.

References

Masonic buildings completed in 1923
Commercial buildings in Savannah
Former Masonic buildings in Georgia (U.S. state)
Madison Square (Savannah) buildings